The food chain in ecology is a chain of trophic relations.

Food chain can refer to the food system, the complex economic and ecological systems that bring food to consumers.

Food chain may also refer to:
 Food Chain (Buffy comic), a comic based on Buffy the Vampire Slayer
 "Food Chain" (Adventure Time), an episode of an animated series
 The Food Chain, a Philippine-based charity
 The Food Chain, a 2014 play by Nicky Silver
 The Food Chain, a 1984 book by Michael Allaby
 Food Chains, a 2014 film
 Food Chain (EP), a 2014 EP by Sean Danielsen
 Food Chain (album), a 2014 album by The Bunny the Bear

See also 
 Food web